The 1992 Currie Cup Rural A & B was the fourth division of the Currie Cup competition, the premier domestic rugby union competition in South Africa. This was the 54th season since the competition started in 1889.

Teams

Changes between 1991 and 1992 seasons
 The Currie Cup Rural C was renamed Currie Cup Rural A for 1992.
This meant the Currie Cup Rural B was reduced to three teams for 1992. In order to increase the amount of fixtures for the Rural B sides, the Rural A competition was expanded to include one round of matches against the Rural B sides.

Competition

There were seven participating teams in the 1992 Currie Cup Rural A & B competition — four Rural A sides and three Rural B sides. These teams played each other once over the course of the season, either at home or away. Teams received two points for a win and one points for a draw. The winner of the Rural A & B competition won the Bankfin Trophy.

Log

Fixtures and results

Round one

Round two

Round three

Round four

Round five

Round six

Round seven

Round eight

Round nine

Round ten

Round eleven

Final

See also
 1992 Currie Cup
 1992 Currie Cup / Central Series
 1992 Currie Cup Central A
 1992 Currie Cup Central B
 1992 Currie Cup Central / Rural Series
 1992 Currie Cup Rural B
 1992 Lion Cup

References

Rural A and B